Wentworth Blackett Beaumont, 1st Baron Allendale (11 April 1829 – 13 February 1907), was a British industrialist and Liberal politician.

Background and education
Allendale was the eldest son of Thomas Beaumont and his wife Henrietta Jane Emma, daughter of John Atkinson, and was educated at Harrow and St John's College, Cambridge.

Business and political career
Allendale was the owner of major estates and mines in Northumberland and also sat as Member of Parliament for Northumberland South from 1852 to 1885 and for Tyneside from 1886 to 1892. In 1906 he was raised to the peerage as Baron Allendale, of Allendale and Hexham in the County of Northumberland.

Family
Lord Allendale married firstly Lady Margaret Anne, daughter of Ulick de Burgh, 1st Marquess of Clanricarde, and his wife the Honourable Harriet, daughter of George Canning, in 1856. They had three sons and three daughters. Their youngest son the Honourable Hubert Beaumont was Liberal Member of Parliament for Eastbourne. After his first wife's death in 1888 Allendale married secondly Edith Althea, daughter of Lieutenant-General Henry Meade-Hamilton and widow of Major-General Sir George Pomeroy-Colley, in 1891. There were no children from this marriage. Lord Allendale died in February 1907, aged 77, and was succeeded in the barony by his eldest son Wentworth, who also became a Liberal politician and was created Viscount Allendale in 1911. Lady Allendale died in May 1927.

References

Kidd, Charles, Williamson, David (editors). Debrett's Peerage and Baronetage (1990 edition). New York: St Martin's Press, 1990.

www.thepeerage.com

External links

1829 births
1907 deaths
People educated at Harrow School
Alumni of St John's College, Cambridge
Barons Allendale
Beaumont, Wentworth
Beaumont, Wentworth
Beaumont, Wentworth
Beaumont, Wentworth
Beaumont, Wentworth
Beaumont, Wentworth
Beaumont, Wentworth
Beaumont, Wentworth
Beaumont, Wentworth
Beaumont, Wentworth
Peers created by Edward VII
People from Allendale, Northumberland